Antti Yrjö Hammarberg (14 September 1943 – 14 January 1991), professionally known as Irwin Goodman, was a popular Finnish rock and folk singer. In the late 1960s he was widely known as a protest singer. He recorded over 300 songs, most of which were his own compositions, with lyrics written by Vexi Salmi. Irwin Goodman started as a protest song singer in the folk boom of the mid-1960s; his humorous songs, often mocking the authorities, became favorites of the Finnish people, to the extent that small Irwin singalike contests are still held by some pubs for entertainment. Goodman had continuing troubles with Finnish tax authorities and had ever-worsening problems with alcohol. His escapades were eagerly followed by sensationalist magazines such as Hymy.

Goodman died of a heart attack while on the way from Vyborg to Hamina, Finland. The story of his life was turned into a feature film, Rentun Ruusu, in 2001.

Irwin's most famous songs include "Poing Poing Poing" (1971), "Haistakaa paska koko valtiovalta" (1976), "Rentun ruusu" (1988), "Ei tippa tapa" (1966), "Työmiehen lauantai" (1965), "En kerro kuinka jouduin naimisiin" (1965) and "Tyttö tuli" (1978). He won the Syksyn Sävel song contest twice.

Common themes in his songs were poverty, taxes, drinking and alcoholism ("Ei tippa tapa", "Vielä yhdet", "Kieltolaki", "Homma käy", "Työmiehen lauantai", "Rentun ruusu" - approximate English translations: "One drop won't kill you", "I'll have another one", "Prohibition", "It's OK", "The workman's Saturday", "The poor man's rose") and problems with money ("Raha ratkaisee", "Kun ei rahat riitä", "Meni rahahommat pieleen", "Manu vippaa muutama markka" - approximate English translations: "Money is the solution", "When you don't have enough money", "I failed the money job", "Manu, lend me a couple of markkas"). He protested the government with songs like "Juhlavalssi" ("Celebration waltz"), and "Haistakaa paska koko valtiovalta" ("The whole government can go fuck themselves").

In 1971, Irwin released an album featuring the actor Esa Pakarinen. His 1972 album Kohta taas on joulu consists of Christmas carols. The later songs ("Suruton nuoruusaika", "Maailma on kaunis", "Ai, ai, ai, kun nuori ois" and "Viimeinen laulu" - approximate English translations: "Youth Without Sorrow", "The World Is Beautiful", "Oh, Oh, Oh, When You're Young", "The Final Song") were often darker in theme than the songs of the 1960s and 1970s.

Albums discography

 Irwinismi (1966)
 Ei tippa tapa (1966)
 Osta minut (1967)
 Reteesti vaan (1968)
 Irwin Goodman (1969)
 Työmiehen lauantai (1970)
 St. Pauli ja Reeperbahn (1970)
 Lonkalta (1971, feat. Esa Pakarinen)
 Poing, poing, poing (1971)
 Kohta taas on joulu (1972)
 Las Palmas (1972)
 Si Si Si (1973)
 Häirikkö (1976)
 Kolmastoista kerta (1977)
 Cha Cha Cha (1977)
 Inkkareita ja länkkäreitä (1977)
 Tyttö tuli (1978)
 Kulkurin kulta (1979, feat. Hanne)
 Keisari Irwin I (1979)
 Härmäläinen perusjuntti (1984)
 Dirly dirly dee (1985)
 Rentun Ruusu (1988)
 Vuosikerta −89 (1989)
 Hurraa – Me teemme laivoja (1990)
 Ai ai ai kun nuori ois'' (1990)

See also
Goodman, a shopping centre in Hämeenlinna named after Irwin Goodman
List of best-selling music artists in Finland

External links 
 

1943 births
1991 deaths
People from Hämeenlinna
20th-century Finnish male singers
Finnish harmonica players